Rumian Railway Station (Urdu and ) is located in Rumian village, Attock district of Punjab province of the Pakistan.

See also
 List of railway stations in Pakistan
 Pakistan Railways

References

Railway stations in Attock District
Railway stations on Karachi–Peshawar Line (ML 1)